Veronica West (née Becker) is an American television producer and writer.

Her credits include Mercy, Brothers & Sisters, GCB, Hart of Dixie and State of Affairs. In 2007, she won a Writers Guild of America, West Award for her work on the series Ugly Betty, sharing the award with the writing staff. She also developed and produced the TV-show High Fidelity starring Zoë Kravitz in 2020.

She is a frequent collaborator with fellow producer/writer Sarah Kucserka and is a graduate of Northwestern University.

Filmography

Television 
The numbers in writing credits refer to the number of episodes.

References

External links

American television producers
American women television producers
American television writers
Northwestern University alumni
American women television writers
Writers Guild of America Award winners
Living people
Place of birth missing (living people)
Year of birth missing (living people)
21st-century American women